Garmestan (also Romanized as Garmestān and Germestān; also known as Gīārmistān) is a village in Kolijan Rostaq-e Olya Rural District, Kolijan Rostaq District, Sari County, Mazandaran Province, Iran. At the 2006 census, its population was 85, in 27 families.

References 

Populated places in Sari County